Herodotos Giorgallas (born 14 December 1977) is a gymnast from Cyprus who took gold at the 2002 Commonwealth Games in Manchester. Herodotos shared the gold with Steve Frew of Scotland. He won the bronze medal in  the Gymnastics for Men's Rings at the 2006 Commonwealth Games in Melbourne.

External links
giorgallas.com

1977 births
Living people
Cypriot male artistic gymnasts
Greek Cypriot people
Commonwealth Games gold medallists for Cyprus
Commonwealth Games bronze medallists for Cyprus
Gymnasts at the 2002 Commonwealth Games
Gymnasts at the 2006 Commonwealth Games
Gymnasts at the 2010 Commonwealth Games
Gymnasts at the 2014 Commonwealth Games
Commonwealth Games medallists in gymnastics

Mediterranean Games silver medalists for Cyprus
Competitors at the 2005 Mediterranean Games
Mediterranean Games medalists in gymnastics
Universiade medalists in gymnastics
Universiade medalists for Cyprus
Medallists at the 2002 Commonwealth Games
Medallists at the 2006 Commonwealth Games
Medallists at the 2010 Commonwealth Games